Athletics, for the 2015 Island Games, was held at the FB Athletics Track

Medal table

Results

Men

Women

References

Island Games
Athletics
2015
2015 Island Games